Yeungnam High School is a school that is in Daegu, South Korea. The motto of the school is somewhat unusual, "Live well", which means hope for students to live collectively, remain hard-working and be right. The flower that symbolizes the school is a forsythia, and the tree of the school is Himalayan Cedar.

History 
The school was established on 1 April 1935.

Alumni 
 Hong Jun-pyo

References 
http://www.yeungnam.hs.kr/html/

Educational institutions established in 1935
High schools in Daegu
1935 establishments in Korea
Boys' schools in South Korea